Jonas Augustin Westman (28 August 1909 – 20 June 1983) was a Swedish skier. He competed in the Nordic combined event at the 1936 Winter Olympics.

Westman attended university in England at Balliol College, Oxford.

References

External links
 

1909 births
1983 deaths
Swedish male Nordic combined skiers
Olympic Nordic combined skiers of Sweden
People from Luleå
Westman family
Alumni of Balliol College, Oxford
Nordic combined skiers at the 1936 Winter Olympics
Sportspeople from Norrbotten County